The John M. Pfau Library  is the library on the campus of California State University, San Bernardino in San Bernardino, California, United States.  It is named after the founding president of the university, Dr. John Martin Pfau. It has two sections totaling 294,000 square feet.

The first library director, Arthur E. Nelson, was appointed by Dr. Pfau in 1963.  Nelson began accumulating materials in a local warehouse and by 1965 had 50,000 books to move into Sierra Hall, one of the first (multipurpose) buildings on the campus.  In 1968, construction began on the current library building which was occupied in 1971.  Later on, a new wing was added which was completed in 1994.

References

University and college academic libraries in the United States
California State depository libraries
California State University, San Bernardino
Library buildings completed in 1971